Aechmea dichlamydea is a species of bromeliad in the genus Aechmea. This species is native to Venezuela and to Trinidad and Tobago.

Varieties
Three botanical varieties are recognized:

Aechmea dichlamydea var. dichlamydea - Tobago
Aechmea dichlamydea var. pariaensis Pittendr. - Sucre
Aechmea dichlamydea var. trinitensis L.B.Sm. - Venezuela and Trinidad

Cultivars
 Aechmea 'Orange Sunset'
 Aechmea 'Shelldancer'

References

dichlamydea
Flora of Venezuela
Flora of Trinidad and Tobago
Plants described in 1879
Taxa named by John Gilbert Baker
Flora without expected TNC conservation status